The Kings of Umaill were rulers of Umaill, a kingdom or territory located in the west of what is now County Mayo, Ireland. 

Its earliest rulers were the semi-historical Tuath mhac nUmhoir. The Umaill, its early historical rulers, were renamed the Uí Briúin Umaill to claim a fictitious relationship with the Uí Briúin. By the 12th century the ruling family adopted the surname Ó Máille, and were reckoned with the Ó Dubhda, Ó Flaithbheartaigh and Mac Conraoi as supreme seafaring clans of Connacht.

Kings of Umaill

 Flannabhra, died 773
 Dunghal mac Flaithniadh, died 776
 Aedhghal, died 779
 Flathghal mac Flannbhrath, died 782
 Cosgrach mac Flannbhrath, died 812
 Cairbre mac Cinaedh, died 847
 Gilla na nInghen Ua Cobhthaigh, died 1004
 Domhnall Ua Máille, died 1176
 Domnall Ruadh Ó Máille, died 11 November 1337
 Owen Ó Máille, died 1362
 Diarmuid mac Owen Ó Máille, died 1362
 Donell Ó Máille, 1401 (Donnell O'Malley, Lord of Umallia, died, after having attained to a good old age.)
 Aodh Ó Máille, died 1415
 Diarmaid Ó Máille, fl. 1415
 Tadhg mac Diarmaid Ó Máille, died 1467
 Eoghan, d. 1513
 Cormac mac Eoghan Ó Máille, died 1523 (1523. O'Maille, i.e. Cormac, son of Eoghan O'Maille, general supporter of the hospitality and nobility of the west of Connacht, mortuus est. Domhnall, son of Thomas O'Maille, assumed his place.)
 Domhnall mac Tomás Ó Máille, fl. 1523
 Eoghan Dubhdara Ó Máille, fl. 1530
 Grace O'Malley, c.1530–c.1603

See also
 O'Malley baronets

External links

http://www.rootsweb.ancestry.com/~irlkik/ihm/connacht.htm#mua

References

 The History of Mayo, p.303, Hubert T. Knox, 1908.
 
 
 
 
 Revised edition of McCarthy's synchronisms at Trinity College Dublin.

States and territories established in the 4th century
History of County Mayo
Lists of Irish monarchs